Chelsea Wetlands is a riparian marsh on lower Pinole Creek and a tidal wetland at its mouth on San Pablo Bay, in Contra Costa County, northern California. It is located within the city of Hercules, in the East Bay region of the San Francisco Bay Area.

History
Originally part of a much larger tidal marsh complex that fringed San Pablo Bay, including along the shoreline of West Contra Costa County. The Chelsea wetlands are the remaining  of undeveloped coastal marsh within Hercules. The seasonal marsh was diked off and a large portion of it filled sometime in the late 19th/early 20th century during the development of the Pinole/Hercules area. It has been further degraded by the dumping of soil from more recent surrounding construction projects.

Ecology
The Chelsea Wetlands remains crucial habitat to wildlife including endangered species such as the California clapper rail and salt marsh common yellowthroat. It was once home to egrets.

Hercules was seeking to restore funds for habitat restoration of lower Pinole Creek in 2012, to protect against flooding into the adjacent city neighborhood, and to restore tidal marsh, floodplain storage, and floodplain habitat functions — to support the flora and fauna native to the Chelsea Wetlands in the riparian zone and the bottom land tidal flood plain.

The San Francisco Bay Trail goes through the area along San Pablo Bay.

See also

References

External links
City of Hercules: Chelsea Wetlands Restoration project — with links to the "Final Conceptual Chelsea Wetlands Restoration Plan" + "Biological Evaluation Report ."

Hercules, California
San Pablo Bay
Wetlands of the San Francisco Bay Area
Landforms of Contra Costa County, California
Marshes of California
San Francisco Bay Trail